Patrick Hall (born November 17, 1973), better known by his stage name Gangsta Pat, is an American rapper from Memphis, Tennessee who established himself in the Memphis underground during the late 1980s and is the son of Stax Records drummer, Willie Hall. Gangsta Pat is also one of the first rap artists from the city to make the move from an indie label to a major label when signing to Atlantic records during the start of the Gangsta rap era. He wrote, produced, and played all of the instruments on his early releases.

Discography

References

External links
 Gangsta Pat on Myspace
 

1972 births
African-American male rappers
Ichiban Records artists
Living people
Rappers from Memphis, Tennessee
Southern hip hop musicians
Gangsta rappers
21st-century American rappers
21st-century American male musicians
21st-century African-American musicians
20th-century African-American people